The Chief of the General Staff of the Ministry of Defense of Uzbekistan is the highest-ranking military officer of in the Armed Forces of the Republic of Uzbekistan, who is responsible for maintaining the operational command of the military and control over three of the five service branches (Uzbek Ground Forces, Uzbek Air Forces and the Uzbek Naval Forces). Unlike the Minister of Defence, the Chief of the General Staff is required to be a commissioned officer who at least holds the rank of colonel (Polkovnik). Another differentiator between the two positions is that the Chief of the General Staff is not political position while the defense minister can be an active member of the political discourse.

The chief performs the following duties in their role:

Administrative and operational leadership of the military operations of troops
Implementation of combat training of troops and adaptation of combat methods to fit modern times.
Give orders/directives regarding units of the armed forces

Professional military chiefs before 2000

List of Chiefs since 2000

References 

Military of Uzbekistan
Chiefs of the General Staff (Uzbekistan)
Uzbekistan